The Chamber of Senators of Salta Province, better known simply as the Senate (Senado), is the upper house of the Legislature of Salta Province, one of Argentina's 23 provinces. It comprises 23 members elected in each of the 23 departments of Salta using the first-past-the-post system.

Senators are elected for four-year terms, and, as in the National Chamber of Deputies and most other provincial legislatures, elections are held every two years, so that half of its members are up in each election. The Senate is presided by the Vice Governor of the province, who is elected every four years alongside the governor. Presently, the post is occupied by Antonio Marocco of the Justicialist Party.

Alongside the Chamber of Deputies, the Senate convenes in the Legislative Palace, in the provincial capital of Salta. The building, a city landmark, is of an Italian academic style. Its construction began in 1892 and extended until 1902.

Notes

References

External links
 

Salta Province
Legislature of Salta
Government of Argentina
Salta, Senate